Frithjof Sælen, Sr. (5 August 1892 – 8 October 1975) was a Norwegian gymnast who competed in the 1912 Summer Olympics and in the 1920 Summer Olympics.

In 1912 he was part of the Norwegian team, which won the gold medal in the gymnastics men's team, free system event. Eight years later he won a silver medal again as member of the Norwegian gymnastics team. He represented the clubs Fredrikshalds TF and IL Norrøna.

Together with Astrid Weltzin (1892–1978) he had the son Frithjof Sælen, Jr.

References

1892 births
1975 deaths
Norwegian male artistic gymnasts
Olympic gymnasts of Norway
Olympic gold medalists for Norway
Olympic silver medalists for Norway
Olympic medalists in gymnastics
Medalists at the 1912 Summer Olympics
Medalists at the 1920 Summer Olympics
Gymnasts at the 1912 Summer Olympics
Gymnasts at the 1920 Summer Olympics
20th-century Norwegian people